Fort Canning MRT station is an underground Mass Rapid Transit (MRT) station on the Downtown Line (DTL), located on the boundary of Museum and Singapore River planning areas, Singapore. Situated on the northern bank of the Singapore River, the station is at the foot of Fort Canning, which the station is named after. The station serves various developments including UE Square and Clarke Quay, as well as Fort Canning Park.

First announced as River Valley MRT station in August 2010, constructing the connecting tunnels to the station was one of the most complex projects on the DTL. It involved the diversion of the Singapore River, while the tunnels to the adjacent Bencoolen station had to be constructed near existing operational tunnels. Starting operations on 21 October 2017 along with the DTL Stage 3 stations, the station is designed to reflect the locality. An artwork Through His Eyes is featured as part of the Art-in-Transit programme.

History

Announcement
The station was first announced as River Valley station on 20 August 2010 when the Land Transport Authority (LTA) announced the 16 stations of the  Downtown Line Stage 3 (DTL 3) which spans between this station and Expo station. The line was expected to be completed in 2017. Contract 937 for the design and construction of River Valley MRT Station and associated tunnels was awarded to GS Engineering & Construction Corp. at a contract sum of S$255.05 million in July 2011. Construction of these stations and tunnels started that month and completed on schedule in 2017.

Construction

The construction of the Fort Canning station and its tunnels accomplished several engineering feats. Constructing the DTL tunnels from Chinatown to this station was a challenge, due to the narrow space between two Housing and Development Board (HDB) blocks and the State Courts along the route. In addition, it was necessary to divert the Singapore River for the tunnels’ construction. The DTL tunnels had to be stacked to overcome the space constraints, while being constructed near the foundations of the State Courts and a HDB block.

Before deciding on the alignment through the Singapore River, 20 other tunnel routes were considered but they were deemed unsafe and/or damaging to the environment. The diversion of the river was necessary as tunnelling underneath would risk ground subsidence or tunnel flooding. The Tunnel Boring Machine (TBM) used could be obstructed by debris that remained stuck into the riverbed. There were considerations to dam the river but it would have disrupted people's livelihoods and tour boat operations on the river.

The river diversion, which started in 2012, involved removing components of the river embankment, constructing a series of dams, strengthening the soil and excavating a new  canal on the river's west bank. A new embankment was built across the original river, which was drained and filled with soil. The debris along the tunnels’ route was removed using piling rigs before tunnelling works commenced. To ensure the works did not pollute the river (which is connected to the Marina Reservoir), the LTA maintained adequate hydraulic flows to keep the water clean. After boring through the area, the river was realigned to its original course.

Diaphragm walls were erected while the station itself is constructed using the top-down method, to minimise any movement to the Expressway.

The tunnels to Bencoolen station were constructed close to the operational tunnels of the North East, North South and Circle lines. Various instruments were used to monitor the live tunnels to ensure the construction of the DTL tunnels did not impact the train operations. To maximise efficiency and reduce the risks of the construction, the geology along the tunnels from Fort Canning to Bencoolen was analysed and the tunnel boring machines' cutter heads were changed at strategic places.

The construction project was recognised by the Institution of Engineers Singapore as one of Singapore's top 50 engineering achievements since its independence. In addition, the project was awarded the International Tunnel Association Tunnelling and Underground Space Awards and Singapore Concrete Institute's Excellence Awards. In May 2018, the project achieved the Building and Construction Authority (BCA) Design and Engineering Safety Excellence Award for that year.

Opening
On 31 May 2017, the LTA announced that the station, together with the rest of DTL 3, will be opened on 21 October that year. Passengers were offered a preview of the station along with the other DTL 3 stations at the DTL 3 Open House on 15 October.

Station details

Fort Canning station serves the Downtown line (DTL) between the Chinatown and Bencoolen stations. The station code is DT20 as reflected on official maps. As the name suggests, the station is located at the foot of Fort Canning Hill underneath River Valley Road. Surrounding developments around the station include Clarke Quay, Robertson Quay, UE Shopping Mall and Fort Canning Park, in addition to religious sites such as the Church of Sacred Heart and Sri Thendayupathani Temple. The station formerly served Liang Court, now to be replaced by CanningHill Piers, a mixed-use development integrated with the station.

To reflect its location near the Fort Canning Park, the station has a natural green theme with an arched ceiling over the station's interior. As a tribute to the former National Theatre that once stood near the station site, abstract patterns of the theatre are featured on the concourse stone walls and railings.

Within the station, each side of the platforms has a cripple siding intended for the withdrawal and storage of trains. This is the first such arrangement on the MRT network, as usually sidings are located along the tunnel's length. Due to the limited space available, the sidings had to be constructed within the station; this reduced construction costs since it would not be necessary to build a separate cut-and-cover structure for the siding on another piece of land.

Station artwork

Commissioned as part of the MRT system's Art-in-Transit (AiT) programme, Through His Eyes by Lim Tze Peng is displayed at this station. The watercolour painting reflects the history of Fort Canning and the Singapore River, which used to be a bustling port. The artwork is depicted from the perspective of Sir Stamford Raffles, who is the founder of modern Singapore, at his residence on the Hill. As Lim no longer works as an artist, the artwork was chosen by the AiT team among the artist's private collection. The artist intends for commuters to experience the work "Through His Eyes" as the river sights "worthy of our remembrance and memories".

Notes and references

Notes

References

Bibliography

External links

Railway stations in Singapore opened in 2017
Singapore River
Mass Rapid Transit (Singapore) stations